1807 was the 21st season of cricket in England since the foundation of Marylebone Cricket Club (MCC). John Willes of Kent first tried to revive the idea of "straight-armed" (i.e., roundarm) bowling, which had originated with Tom Walker in the 1790s.

Honours
 Most runs – William Lambert 355 (HS 110)
 Most wickets – John Wells 24

Events
 John Willes of Kent first tried to revive the idea of "straight-armed" (i.e., roundarm) bowling, which had originated with Tom Walker in the 1790s.
 With the Napoleonic War continuing, loss of investment and manpower impacted cricket and only 7 first-class matches have been recorded in 1807:
 18–19 May: MCC v Middlesex @ Lord's Old Ground
 25–26 May: All-England v Hampshire @ Lord's Old Ground
 2–3 June: MCC v All-England @ Lord's Old Ground
 15–16 June: All-England v Hampshire @ Lord's Old Ground
 22–24 June: Lord F Beauclerk's XI v T Mellish's XI @ Lord's Old Ground
 29–30 June: All-England v Surrey @ Lord's Old Ground
 13 July: All-England v Surrey @ Lord's Old Ground

Debutants
1807 debutants included:
 John Bentley (Middlesex)
 Noah Mann junior (MCC)

References

Bibliography

Further reading
 
 
 
 
 

1807 in English cricket
English cricket seasons in the 19th century